Banta is a carbonated lemon or orange-flavoured soft drink popular in India. 

Banta may also refer to:

Places
 Banta, California, an unincorporated community
 Banta, Indiana, an unincorporated community
 an early name of Dunlap, Missouri, an unincorporated community
 Banta Island, one of the Lesser Sunda Islands, Indonesia
 the 'Banța', a hill next to the center of the town of Ocna Mureș, Romania

People
 Albert Franklin Banta  (1843–1924), American newspaperman, politician, jurist and army scout
 Arthur M. Banta (1877–1946), American zoologist
 Bradford Banta (born 1970), American former football player
 George Banta  (1857–1935), American businessman
 Jack Banta (American football) (1917–1977), American National Football League player 
 Jack Banta (baseball) (1925–2006), American Major League Baseball pitcher
 Lisa Banta (born 1979), American Paralympic goalball player and discus thrower
 Melissa Elizabeth Riddle Banta (1834–1907), American poet
 Parke M. Banta (1891–1970), a United States Representative from Missouri

Fictional characters
 Tony Banta, in the American TV series Taxi, played by Tony Danza
 Banta, a stock character in Sardarji jokes

Other uses
 Golisoda (English title Banta), a 2016 Indian Kannada-language film
 Banta, a work by American photographer Osamu James Nakagawa (born 1962)
 Banta (butterfly), a genus of butterflies
 Neoregelia 'Banta', a hybrid cultivar
 bantã, a Malinké name for the Ceiba pentandra tropical tree
 Banta Corporation, an  America printing, imaging, and supply chain management company
 Manta language (also Banta), spoken in Cameroon
 banta, a Swedish verb for "being on a diet", derived from dieting pioneer William Banting (1796–1878)

See also
 Jean LaBanta (c. 1879–after 1926), American conman, forger and train robber